Osmanca can refer to:

 Osmanca, Bigadiç
 Osmanca, Düzce